Marie Lavieille may refer to:

 Marie Adrien Lavieille (1852–1911), French painter
 Marie Ernestine Lavieille (1852–1937), French painter